Glenn Thompson (born 19 November 1969) is a former English cricketer. Thompson's is a right handed batsman and right hand medium fast bowler.

Thompson represented the Northamptonshire Cricket Board in a single List A match against Wiltshire in the 1999 NatWest Trophy.  In his only List A match, he took a single wicket at a cost of 13 runs and in the field he took a single catch.

References

External links
Glenn Thompson at Cricinfo
Glenn Thompson at CricketArchive

1969 births
Living people
English cricketers
Northamptonshire Cricket Board cricketers